Bodinga is a Local Government Area in Sokoto State, Nigeria. Its headquarters are in the town of Bodinga.

It has an area of 564 km and a population of 175,406 at the 2006 census.

The postal code of the area is 852.

References

Local Government Areas in Sokoto State